Ian Douglas Ben Proctor  (12 July 1918 – 23 July 1992) was a British designer of boats, both sailing dinghies and cruisers. He had more than one hundred designs to his credit, from which an estimate of at least 65,000 boats were built. His pioneering aluminium mast designs also revolutionised the sport of sailing.

Early life and education
Proctor was a son of Douglas McIntyre Proctor and Mary Albina Louise Proctor (née Tredwen). He was educated at Gresham's School in Holt, Norfolk. After leaving school, he studied at the University of London.

In 1943, he married Elizabeth Anne Gifford Lywood, the daughter of Air Vice-Marshal O. G. Lywood, CB, CBE. They had three sons and a daughter.

Proctor contracted Polio in Alexandria, and lived the remainder of his life with weakened lungs, arm and shoulder.

Career

Early career
From 1942 to 1946, during World War II, Proctor was a Flying Officer in the Royal Air Force Volunteer Reserve. From 1947 to 1948, he was Managing Director of Gosport Yacht Co., then, from 1948 to 1950, he was joint editor of Yachtsman Magazine.

Dinghy designer

Ian Proctor first began to design dinghies professionally in 1950. The National 12 was soon followed by the Merlin Rocket. Proctor's early designs were met with immediate success, winning championships from 1950 to 1952. His design of Proctor Spars revolutionised dinghy sailing. Then in 1958 he designed the Wayfarer, which soon became a hit with sailing schools and still has a strong following in racing and cruising circles. One Wayfarer was sailed from the UK to Norway and Iceland by Frank Dye, and this boat is now on display at the National Maritime Museum, Falmouth.

The most widely known of all Ian Proctor designs has to be the Topper of which more than 46,000 have been produced to date. This was the first sailing dinghy to be produced from injection moulded plastic; a system which cost a million pounds to set up and was the largest single mold at the time.  The first boats however were built from glassfibre (GRP).  There is a large topper racing circuit in the UK and also like the Wanderer has an enthusiastic racing following.

Yacht designer
Although better known for his dinghy designs and aluminium masts, Ian Proctor was also responsible for the design of several small cruisers. His first cruiser was the Seagull for Bell Woodworking, followed shortly afterwards by the Seamew. Later on there was the Nimrod, Eclipse, Pirate, and the Prelude.

Mast designer
In 1953 Ian Proctor's 'Cirrus' had an all-metal mast. Proctor quickly realised the potential of metal masts and in 1953 he designed the first all-metal tapered and extruded mast for sailing dinghies. Then in 1955 he established 'Ian Proctor Metal Masts Limited' as a commercial venture. Proctor Masts soon became the leading metal mast producers for all types of sailing craft. Indeed, by 1960, 13 different countries were using Proctor masts in the Olympics and the 1987 America's Cup featured 12 boats using Proctor masts.

Proctor Masts eventually became part of the Sélden group, and now trade as Sélden masts.

Writing
Proctor wrote extensively about sailing. As well as his earlier stint as joint editor of Yachtsman Magazine, he was, from 1950 to 1964, the yachting correspondent of the Daily Telegraph. His books included:
Racing Dinghy Handling, 1948
Racing Dinghy Maintenance, 1949
Sailing: Wind and Current, 1950
Boats for Sailing, 1968
Sailing Strategy, 1977

Ian Proctor Designs

 Adventuress
 Beaufort
 Blue Peter
 Bosun
 CL 16
 Gull
 Kestrel, the first dinghy designed to be built in glass fibre.
 Leprechaun, Built by Thomas Thompson of Carlow and adopted by Blessington Sailing Club. (About 10 boats built.)
 Marlin
 Merlin Rocket (not the only designer as the Merlin Rocket is a development class)
 Minisail
 Eclipse, commissioned by Newbridge Yachts.
 National 18 (1968)
 Nimrod, commissioned by Westerly
 Osprey, raced as a One-Design class and despite the cosmetic improvements that have occurred since the designs inception, older boats can still (and often do) compete at the top end of the fleet.
 Pirate, commissioned by Rydgeway Marine
 Prelude, commissioned by Rydgeway Marine
 Seagull, commissioned by Bell Woodworking
 Seamew, commissioned by Bell Woodworking
 SigneT
 Tempest
 Topper
 Wanderer
 Wayfarer

Honours and awards
 Royal Designer for Industry
 Fellow of the Royal Society of Arts
 Yachtsman of the Year, 1965. Unusually awarded for his work as a designer rather as a noted yachtsman.
 Council of Industrial Design Award, 1967
 Design Council Awards, 1977, 1980

References

Further reading

1918 births
1992 deaths

People educated at Gresham's School
British yacht designers
Boat and ship designers
People from Norfolk
People with polio
Royal Air Force Volunteer Reserve personnel of World War II
Royal Air Force officers